Magog Township is a former township in the Canadian province of Quebec. It was amalgamated into the city of Magog in 2002.

References

Communities in Estrie
Former municipalities in Quebec
Magog, Quebec
Populated places disestablished in 2002